The 2020–21 Louisville Cardinals women's basketball team represented the University of Louisville during the 2020–21 NCAA Division I women's basketball season. The Cardinals, were led by 14th-year head coach Jeff Walz, and played their home games at the KFC Yum! Center in their seventh year in the Atlantic Coast Conference. On January 18, 2021, following a 12-0 start, the Cardinals were ranked number 1 in the AP Poll for the first time in program history, garnering 20 of 29 first place votes.

The Cardinals finished the season 26–4 and 14–2 in ACC play to finish in first place. In the ACC tournament, they defeated Wake Forest in the Quarterfinals and Syracuse before losing in the Final NC State.  They received an at-large bid to the NCAA tournament where they were the two seed in the Alamo Regional.  In the tournament they defeated fifteen seed  in the First Round, seven seed Northwestern in the Second Round, and six seed Oregon in the Sweet Sixteen before losing to one seed and eventual champions  Stanford in the Elite Eight to end their season.

Previous season
The Cardinals finished the 2019–20 season at 28–4 and 16–2 in ACC play.  They finished as the regular season ACC champions and earned the first seed in the ACC tournament.  They defeated Syracuse in the Quarterfinals before losing to eventual champions NC State in the Semifinals.  The NCAA tournament was cancelled due to the COVID-19 outbreak.

Off-season

Departures

Incoming transfers

Recruiting Class

Source:

Roster

Schedule and results

Source

|-
!colspan=6 style=| Non-Conference Regular season

|-
!colspan=6 style=| ACC Regular season

|-
!colspan=6 style=| ACC Women's Tournament

|-
!colspan=6 style=| NCAA tournament

Rankings

Coaches did not release a Week 2 poll and AP does not release a final poll.

 This is the first time Louisville has been ranked number 1 in the AP Women's Basketball Poll in program history.

References

Louisville Cardinals women's basketball seasons
Louisville
Louisville Cardinals women's basketball, 2020-21
Louisville Cardinals women's basketball, 2020-21
Louisville